Dayr 'Amr was a Palestinian Arab village in the Jerusalem Subdistrict. It was depopulated during the 1948 Arab-Israeli War on July 17, 1948, by the Fourth Battalion of the Har'el Brigade, during the second stage of Operation Dan. It was located 12.5 km west of Jerusalem. Dayr 'Amr was named after a local sage known by al-Sa'i 'Amr and a shrine was in the village dedicated to him.

History
In 1863, Victor Guérin found here a wali, devoted to a Sheikh Amer, and this wali gave name to the neighbouring "ruin", which he described as "twenty small chambers, half of which have been collapsed and enclosed within the same enclosure: they were constructed with materials of all kinds and date from the Middle Ages."  He also noted five cisterns had been excavated from the rock, and appeared to be older.

In 1883, the PEF's Survey of Western Palestine found "ruined walls" at  Khurbet Deir 'Amr.

British Mandate era
In the 1922 census of Palestine, conducted by the British Mandate authorities, Dair Amr had a population 5, all Muslims,  while in the 1931 census,   it was counted with Suba, and together they had a population of 434 Muslims, in 110 houses.

Freya Stark recalled how she met with Ahmad Samih Khalidi, the principal of Arab College (Jerusalem), and "his charming Syrian wife"  and inspected the orphanage which was built at Dayr 'Amr. The first £ 1,000 was collected among fourteen Arabs of Jerusalem, who started it in 1940. They built a school, a farm, and a directors house in "strong stone" at the top of a stony hill. The student learned agriculture, which they could use when they returned to their villages.

In the 1945 statistics only 10 Muslims were recorded, with a total of 3,072   dunums of land.  Of this, 18 dunams were for irrigable land or plantations, 650 for cereals,  while 2,404 dunams were non-cultivable land.

1948, aftermath

In 1952, the  buildings of the boys' farm were transformed into the Israeli mental hospital Eitanim

In 1992, the place was described in the following terms: "The site is surrounded with a fence and a guarded gate. All the houses still stand and new extensions have been added to some of them. Large cypress and carob trees grow among the houses. There is an olive grove on the southern edge of the village. The Bezek telephone and television company has established a large facility, with radar equipment, at the southern edge of the site. The psychiatric hospital of Eytanim is nearby."

References

References

External links
Welcome To Dayr 'Amr
Dayr 'Amr, Zochrot
Survey of Western Palestine, Map 17: IAA, Wikimedia commons 
Dayr 'Amr from the Khalil Sakakini Cultural Center
Dayr 'Amr, Palestine Family.net 

Arab villages depopulated during the 1948 Arab–Israeli War
District of Jerusalem